The Spoilers is a 1923 American silent Western film directed by Lambert Hillyer. It is set in Nome, Alaska during the 1898 Gold Rush, with Milton Sills as Roy Glennister, Anna Q. Nilsson as Cherry Malotte, and Noah Beery Sr. as Alex McNamara. The film culminates in a saloon fistfight between Glennister and McNamara.

The Spoilers was adapted to screen by Elliott J. Clawson from the 1906 Rex Beach novel of the same name.  Film versions also appeared in 1914, 1930 (with Gary Cooper as Glennister and Betty Compson as Cherry Malotte), 1942 (with John Wayne as Glennister, Marlene Dietrich as Malotte, and Randolph Scott as McNamara), and finally in 1955 with Anne Baxter as Malotte, Jeff Chandler as Glennister and Rory Calhoun as McNamara.

The character of Cherry Malotte also appears in Beach's The Silver Horde (1930), portrayed by Evelyn Brent.

Plot summary

Cast

Preservation
A print of The Spoilers is maintained in the film archives at Gosfilmofond in Moscow and the Centre National du Cinéma at Fort de Bois-d'Arcy.

References

External links

 
 
 
 

1923 films
1923 Western (genre) films
Films based on American novels
Films directed by Lambert Hillyer
Films set in Alaska
Goldwyn Pictures films
Films based on Western (genre) novels
American black-and-white films
Films based on The Spoilers (Beach novel)
Remakes of American films
Silent American Western (genre) films
1920s American films
1920s English-language films